The Kate Sheppard Cup, currently known as the  New Zealand Football Foundation Kate Sheppard Cup for sponsorship purposes, is New Zealand's premier knockout tournament in women's association football. Founded in 1994, it was known as the Women's Knockout Cup, until it was renamed in 2018. What would have been the 2020 edition of the competition, was cancelled because of COVID-19 but the competition continued again in 2021.

Format
The Kate Sheppard Cup is a national club based competition, women's teams from all clubs that are members of their regional association affiliated to New Zealand Football are allowed to enter and is competed for during the winter club season. In March each year NZ Football calls for clubs to enter their teams and all teams that have entered shall compete on a knockout basis until two teams remain unbeaten to contest the final in September.

New Zealand football handles the drawing of teams and at the start of the competition teams from within certain Football Federations are drawn against each other to save on travel costs. Football Federations Northern, Auckland and Waikato/Bay of Plenty could be drawn against each other, as could teams from Waikato/Bay of Plenty and Central Football, Central Football and Capital Football, and Mainland and Southern Region. The competition becomes an open draw from the semi final stage with teams being required to travel, at their cost, throughout New Zealand.

History
The Kate Sheppard Cup is New Zealand Footballs women's national club based knockout competition that was first played in 1994 and called the Women's Knockout Cup. The competition starts with regional games until the semi-final then two Northern Region teams will play each other in one semi-final, and the Central Region winner will play the Southern Region winner in the other semi.

The final is usually played as part of a double-header, with the Chatham Cup Final (the men's club teams competition) as part of the traditional ending to the New Zealand football season in September.

The very first game saw Halswell United defeat New Brighton 2–0. The first final took place at Christchurch's English Park and saw local team Nomads United emerge as the first winners of the competition, beating Waikato Unicol on penalties 4–3 after a scoreless final.

The second year of the competition saw Waikato Unicol make the final again but this time winning the competition, before the start of the Northern Region dominance at the expense of Lower Hutt club Petone who in four consecutive finals from 1995 to 1998 finished runners-up.

Three Kings United where the first team to complete a "three-peat" winning the cup from 1997 to 1999 only to be succeeded by Lynn-Avon United who won it five years in a row from 2002–2006. They are also the cups most successful team winning the trophy nine times.

On 8 March 2018, coinciding with International Women's Day and in celebration of the 125th anniversary of the women's suffrage movement, which was led by Kate Sheppard who helped women earn the right to vote in New Zealand. The cup was renamed as the Kate Sheppard Cup.

In 2021, the Kate Sheppard Cup saw a record number of 57 teams enter, increasing by 40% from the previous edition.

Past winners

Maia Jackman Trophy
A Maia Jackman Trophy is presented annually to the player adjudged to have made the most positive impact in the Kate Sheppard final. Originally just the Most valuable player trophy, it was renamed in 2013 after Maia Jackman who herself won the MVP trophy in the 1996 and 1998 Women's Knockout Cup finals.

 1994 – Not Awarded
 1995 – Not Awarded
 1996 – Maia Jackman (Lynn-Avon United)
 1997 – Maria Wilkie (Three Kings United)
 1998 – Maia Jackman (Three Kings United)
 1999 – Nicky Smith (Wairarapa United)
 2000 – Amanda Crawford (Lynn-Avon United)
 2001 – Priscilla Duncan (Ellerslie)
 2002 – Yvonne Vale (Lynn-Avon United)
 2003 – Sara Clapham (Lynn-Avon United)
 2004 – Melissa Ray (Lynn-Avon United)
 2005 – Michele Keinzley (Lynn-Avon United)
 2006 – Ria Percival (Lynn-Avon United)
 2007 – Nicky Smith (Western Springs)
 2008 – Kirsty Yallop (Lynn-Avon United)

 2009 – Katie Hoyle (Lynn-Avon United)
 2010 – Olivia Chance (Claudelands Rovers)
 2011 – Steph Skilton (Glenfield Rovers)
 2012 – Annalie Longo (Three Kings United)
 2013 – Laura Merrin (Coastal Spirit)
 2014 – Katie Rood (Glenfield Rovers)
 2015 – Estelle Harrison (Glenfield Rovers)
 2016 – Tessa Berger (Forrest Hill-Milford United)
 2017 – Kate Loye (Glenfield Rovers)
 2018 – Shontelle Smith (Dunedin Technical)
 2019 – Tayla O'Brien and Erinna Wong (Eastern Suburbs)
 2020 – Not Awarded
 2021 – Emma Main (Wellington United)
 2022 – Katie Duncan (Auckland United)

Performances

By team

By Federation

See also
 National Women's League

References

External links
Official website

 
Women's association football in New Zealand
Association football cup competitions in New Zealand
Women's association football competitions in Oceania
Women's national association football cups
1994 establishments in New Zealand
Cultural depictions of Kate Sheppard